Baljevac is a village located in the municipality of Obrenovac, Belgrade, Serbia. As of 2011 census, it has a population of 507 inhabitants.

References

 Popis stanovništva, domaćinstava i Stanova 2002. Knjiga 1: Nacionalna ili etnička pripadnost po naseljima. Republika Srbija, Republički zavod za statistiku Beograd 2003. 

Suburbs of Belgrade